Battle Club may refer to:

 Club (weapon)
 Battle Club (manga), a manga series from the creators of Ikki Tousen